10th Anniversary Live is the first video album by Finnish folk metal band Ensiferum. It was filmed on New Year's Eve, 2005 at the music hall Nosturi in Helsinki, Finland.

Track listing

Credits
Ensiferum
 Petri Lindroos − vocals, guitar
 Markus Toivonen − guitar, clean vocals
 Meiju Enho − keyboards
 Sami Hinkka − bass, clean vocals
 Janne Parviainen − drums

Additional musicians
 Kaisa Saari − Vocals (11 and 12)
 Ville Tuomi − Vocals (15)
 Kristian Ranta – Introduces Ensiferum at start of the concert

References

Ensiferum live albums
2006 video albums
Live video albums
2006 live albums
Spinefarm Records live albums
Spinefarm Records video albums
Ensiferum video albums